Dagmar Havlová (born Dagmar Veškrnová on 22 March 1953) is a Czech actress. She married Václav Havel, the former Czech President, on 4 January 1997. She has one daughter, Nina Veškrnová (born 1976), from a previous marriage to Radvít Novák (1975–1980).

Early life
Havlová was born to Markéta Veškrnová and harmonist Karel Veškrna on 22 March 1953 in Brno. She graduated from the Brno Conservatory in 1971. In 1975, she graduated with the title of "Magister artis" (equivalent to Master of Fine Arts) from the Janáček Academy of Musical Arts.

Career
She has made over 50 appearances in films and 200 appearances on television.

See also
Václav Havel
Barrandov Terraces
Dagmar (novel)

Awards 
Servare et Manere: Friend of Peace. Since 2020 became the official Friend of Peace of the International Tree of Peace Project and also the Patron for the Czech Republic.

References

External links

 Dagmar Havlová Biography on former official website of the Czech President. 1997–2003.
 Biography of Dagmar Veškrnová Havlová, press release, government of Malta, 22 June 2004.
 "Dagmar Havlova Starts Rehearsing at Na Vinohradech Theatre", Official Information Service, City of Prague announcement, 2 Jan. [2006].
 Dagmar Veškrnová at the Internet Movie Database

|-

1953 births
Living people
First ladies of the Czech Republic
Czech film actresses
Actors from Brno
Czech stage actresses
Janáček Academy of Music and Performing Arts alumni
21st-century Czech actresses
20th-century Czech actresses
Brno Conservatory alumni